Greatest Hits is a greatest hits album by the American rock band ZZ Top, released in 1992.

Overview
Most of the songs come from albums released during 1979–1990, from Degüello through Recycler. Exceptions include remixes of "Tush" and "La Grange", and the non-album tracks  "Viva Las Vegas" and "Gun Love". "Viva Las Vegas" was previously released as a single.

The vinyl version of the album omitted four tracks included on the CD version ("Cheap Sunglasses",  "I'm Bad, I'm Nationwide", "Pearl Necklace", and "Planet of Women") and some tracks on the vinyl version are also edited from the original running length.

A companion video album titled Greatest Hits: The Video Collection was also released.

Track listing

CD
All songs by Billy Gibbons, Dusty Hill and Frank Beard except otherwise indicated

Vinyl
All songs by Billy Gibbons, Dusty Hill and Frank Beard except otherwise indicated

Personnel
Billy Gibbons – guitar, lead vocals (1-3, 5-7, 9-18)
Dusty Hill – bass guitar, backing and lead vocals (4, 8), keyboards
Frank Beard – drums, percussion

Production
Producer – Bill Ham
Engineer – Joe Hardy, Bob Ludwig, Terry Manning
Art Direction – Jeri Heiden
Design – Leslie Wintner
Photography – Glen Wexler
Liner Notes – Bob Merlis, Davin Seay

Charts

Weekly charts

Year-end charts

Certifications

References

1992 greatest hits albums
Albums produced by Bill Ham
ZZ Top compilation albums
Warner Records compilation albums